is a Japanese football player. He plays for Zweigen Kanazawa from 2023.

Career
On 26 December 2022, Kojima announcement officially transfer return to former club, Zweigen Kanazawa as permanent for upcoming 2023 season.

Career statistics
Updated to the end of 2022 season.

References

External links
Profile at Machida Zelvia
Profile at Vegalta Sendai

1997 births
Living people
Association football people from Saitama Prefecture
Japanese footballers
J1 League players
J2 League players
Vegalta Sendai players
FC Machida Zelvia players
Zweigen Kanazawa players
Thespakusatsu Gunma players
Association football defenders